The Dyson Institute of Engineering and Technology is a private institution of higher education in England, founded in 2017 by James Dyson and based at the Dyson technology campus in Malmesbury, Wiltshire. Students work in a position in the Dyson company for three days a week, receive a salary, and have their tuition fees paid during their four-year course.

Origins and architecture
James Dyson had been outspoken about an engineering skills shortage and training for engineers in the United Kingdom. In November 2016, he announced the planned launch of the Dyson Institute.

 As part of the development of the Institute, accommodation and communal spaces for undergraduates were designed and built in collaboration with Wilkinson Eyre. Completed in 2019, the village consists of pre-fabricated cross-laminate timber pods, arranged in clusters around a central communal building which houses a cafe, bar, and screening room. The Dyson Institute Village was entered into the residential category of the 2019 World Architecture News awards, and the housing project of the year category of the 2019 World Architecture Festival awards.

Intake and courses
The Dyson Institute offered a single degree (Bachelor of Engineering) to the first, second and third cohorts, starting in September 2017, September 2018 and September 2019 respectively. The first two years of the four-year program were to cover the fundamentals of engineering, then specialized electronics and mechanical engineering courses would follow in the final two years.
 
The entry requirements for 2017 included AAB grades at A-level including an A in Mathematics and in another science or technology subject. Fourth-year students might be eligible to spend time at Dyson facilities in Malaysia or Singapore.

Student intake in September 2018 was 43, and by 2020 there were 150 undergraduates. 

Degrees are awarded in partnership with the University of Warwick, and lectures are given by professors from Warwick as well as Dyson engineers. In October 2020, it was announced that the Institute will be granted its own degree-awarding powers in 2021, making it the first alternative provider in the United Kingdom with this function.

References

External links

Education in Wiltshire
Educational institutions established in 2017
Higher education colleges in England
James Dyson
2017 establishments in England
Malmesbury
Research institutes in Wiltshire